IMAX Corporation is a Canadian theatre company which designs and manufactures IMAX cameras and projection systems as well as performing film development, production, post-production and distribution to IMAX-affiliated theatres worldwide. Founded in Montreal in 1967, it has headquarters in the Toronto area, and operations in New York City and Los Angeles.

As of December 2019, there were 1,624 IMAX theatres located in 81 countries, of which 1,529 were in commercial multiplexes. These include IMAX variations such as IMAX 3D, IMAX Dome, and Digital IMAX. The CEO is Richard Gelfond.

History
IMAX is a Canadian corporation that is based in Mississauga, Ontario. The company was founded in 1967 when three filmmakers—Graeme Ferguson, Roman Kroitor and Robert Kerr—incorporated IMAX Corporation.  The idea and the new technology, which resulted in the birth of the company, came from the multi-screen productions of Roman Kroitor, Colin Low and Hugh O'Connor. In the Labyrinth and Ferguson's Man and the Polar Regions (on which Robert Kerr collaborated), both screened at the Expo 67. From their experience, Graeme Ferguson, Roman Kroitor and Robert Kerr realized that new technology would be necessary to develop a larger and more complex project than previously seen.  As a result, they sought an engineer named William Shaw in 1968 (he had gone to Galt Collegiate Institute in Galt, Ontario, now Cambridge, with Ferguson and Kerr) to help develop this technology.  Shaw created this new projector that allowed for films to have exceptionable quality and to be ten times larger than conventional 35mm picture frames. The first movie IMAX Corporation produced using this new technology was Tiger Child, which was featured at Expo '70 in Osaka, Japan. It was because of the multi-screen viewing that Graeme Ferguson, Roman Kroitor and Robert Kerr wanted to create a theatre with giant screens, surround sound and stadium seating.

William Shaw was instrumental in helping IMAX Corporation fulfill its ambitions in creating larger and more realistic experiences for audience which included oversized screens, surround sound and steep seating for better viewing. Shaw remained at IMAX (although officially retired) as a designer and inventor until his passing on August 31, 2002, at the age of 73. Before retiring, Shaw created a 3D camera which was sent to the International Space Station for IMAX films. In 1994, investment bankers Gelfond and Bradley Wechsler acquired IMAX Corporation through a leveraged buyout and publicly listed the company on the NASDAQ stock exchange. IMAX then began to focus their abilities on attracting Hollywood production houses. Another engineer at IMAX Corporation, Brian Bonnick, Chief Technology Officer at IMAX Corporation, developed technologies that made it possible for the worldwide IMAX to produce major Hollywood films. More flexible technology required by that industry led to the development of the IMAX DMR (Digital Re-Mastering), which was able to adapt quickly in various locations. Newer technology followed, including the IMAX Experience and the IMAX MPX theatre system. Revamped IMAX 2D footage has been transferred into IMAX 3D. In September 2022, IMAX Corporation acquired streaming technology company Ssimwave for $21 million in a cash and stock deal.

Recent milestones
 In April 2009, Gelfond became the sole IMAX CEO and Wechsler moved into the role of chairman of the board of directors. 
 Later in 2009, IMAX participated in the movie Avatar, to which the company credits its mainstream Hollywood success. 
 In March 2011, IMAX noted that China's Wanda Cinema Line announced a 75-theatre deal with IMAX Corporation. 
 In 2012, IMAX opened its first location in Tianjin, China. 
 On October 8, 2015, IMAX China, a subsidiary of the company, was listed on the Hong Kong Stock Exchange. According to The Hollywood Reporter and The Wall Street Journal, "IMAX China raised $248million in its initial public offering," which was the "bottom of [the] indicative price range." 
 , there were 1,624 theatres in 81 countries and territories.

Co-productions 

In November 2016, Marvel Television and IMAX announced the live action television series Marvel's Inhumans, based on the superhero race of the same name. The series, co-produced with ABC Studios, saw IMAX serve as a financing partner, a first for IMAX, which allowed Marvel to spend more on the series than it had on its other television series, especially for visual effects. The entire series was filmed with IMAX digital cameras. Inhumans debuted an edited specific for theatrical-release version of the first two episodes. The episodes debuted on IMAX screens in theatres worldwide in September 2017, with the series airing weekly on ABC afterwards. After the poor reception to the IMAX version of the first two episodes and a box office gross of $3.5million, Richard Gelfond said, "Going forward, we intend to take a more conservative approach consistent with the Game of Thrones approach to capital investments and content. We will be more conservative when considering whether to invest our own capital; and if so, to what extent."

See also 
 3net

References

External links
 

1967 establishments in Quebec
3D imaging
Canadian companies established in 1967
Companies based in Mississauga
Companies formerly listed on the Toronto Stock Exchange
Companies listed on the New York Stock Exchange
Entertainment companies established in 1967
IMAX Corporation
Movie theatre chains in Canada
Movie theatre chains in the United States
Recipients of the Scientific and Technical Academy Award of Merit
Technology companies established in 1967